The Meyer–Kiser Building (also known as the Dade Commonwealth Building) is a historic U.S. building in Miami, Florida. It was built in 1925, the same year the Dade County Courthouse began construction. It is located at 139 NE 1st street. On January 4, 1999, it was added to the U.S. National Register of Historic Places. The building was once one of the tallest in Miami, and Dade County, completed the same year as the Freedom Tower, but was badly damaged during the 1926 Miami hurricane, and it was reduced from 17 to 7 stories. In 2015, new owners announced a plan to restore the building close to its original design.

References

External links

Dade County listings, Florida's Office of Cultural and Historical Programs

Buildings and structures in Miami
National Register of Historic Places in Miami
Chicago school architecture in Florida